Scheibenberg is a town in the district of Erzgebirgskreis in Saxony in Germany. It is situated in the Ore Mountains, 8 km southwest of Annaberg-Buchholz, and 9 km east of Schwarzenberg.

History 
From 1952 to 1990, Scheibenberg was part of the Bezirk Karl-Marx-Stadt of East Germany.

References 

Erzgebirgskreis